Rüya Taner (born 1971) is a Turkish Cypriot pianist. She was born in Germany and settled in Ankara, Turkey, in the early 1980s, where she studied at the State Conservatory. Taner is acknowledged as one of the leading Turkish pianists of the contemporary generation.

References

External links
Official Website
About her recent performance (in German)

Turkish Cypriot musicians
Turkish classical pianists
Turkish women pianists
Cypriot classical pianists
Women classical pianists
Living people
1971 births
German people of Turkish descent
Turkish people of Cypriot descent
21st-century classical pianists
21st-century women pianists